Inam-Veerapur is a village in Dharwad district of Karnataka, India.

Demographics 
As of the 2011 Census of India there were 108 households in Inam-Veerapur and a total population of 539 consisting of 281 males and 258 females. There were 62 children ages 0-6.

References

Villages in Dharwad district